This All-time LNFS table show one and all of teams who played at some point in División de Honor since its inception in 1989–90 season. División de Honor changed its name in 2011 to Primera División.

The list is incomplete. It will be filled gradually.

All-time LNFS table
<onlyinclude>

Updated at completion of 2014–15 season.

League or status at 2015–16 season:

References
Own work
All statistics were taken from LNFS's statistics.

External links
LNFS website

Liga Nacional de Fútbol Sala